Botswana competed in the 2007 All-Africa Games held at the Stade du 5 Juillet in the city of Algiers, Algeria. The country came ninth with a total of thirteen medals. The team was particularly successful in athletics, winning five gold medals in track and field events as well as beating the continental record in the T46 200 metres sprint.

Background
Botswana first competed the All Africa Games in 1991 and increasingly saw the event as an opportunity to demonstrate its prowess in sport. Its investment paid off and the team returned from each successive event with medals. In 2000, Botswana put a bid in to host the 2007 Games but was unsuccessful, being beaten by Algeria. Nonetheless, the country sent a strong team of competitors to the Games, with support from the new Ministry of Youth, Sports and Culture recently formed in 2007.

Competitors
Botswanan athletes competed in a wide range of events, including chess, track and field, swimming and volleyball. The country came fourth in women's chess, gaining a total of 18 points. The men's volleyball team qualified but won no medals. In contrast, the team secured five gold medals in athletics.
As well as winning Gold, Tshotlego Morama set a new African record at 200 metres.

Medal summary
Botswana achieved a total of thirteen medals, six gold, two silver and five bronze, ranking ninth overall.

List of Medalists

Medal table

Gold Medal

Silver Medal

Bronze Medal

See also
Botswana at the African Games

References

2007 in Botswana sport
2007
Nations at the 2007 All-Africa Games